Bo Jangeborg is a Swedish computer programmer. He made several programs for the ZX Spectrum, the best known being the game Fairlight (1985), its sequel Fairlight II (1986), and the graphic tool The Artist. He also wrote Flash!, the art package provided with every SAM Coupé.

Today he runs the small software company Softwave.

References

External links
 Softography
 Bo Jangeborg interview from issue 6 of The ZX Files, 1998.
 Bo Jangeborg interview from a Swedish newspaper, 2015.

Year of birth missing (living people)
Living people
Swedish video game designers
Swedish computer programmers
Place of birth missing (living people)